Ayub Shahobiddinov (born 26 May 1977) is an Uzbek film director. He is recognized as honored artist of Uzbekistan.

Education 
Shahobiddinov was born on 26 May 1977 in Tashkent.

He graduated from the Uzbekistan State Institute of Arts and Culture in 1999. After graduation he worked as a director for the National TV and Radio company. After some time, he applied for the Institute of Cinematography in Russia, so he studies there for two years and attends the masterclasses of S. Sovolyov and V. Rubinchik. Finishing the course, he returns home and starts his career at the leading film studios of Uzbekistan, Uzbekfilm.

Career 
His debut film Qor qo'ynida lola (Tulip in the snow, 2003) receives Gran-prix at "Ijodiy Parvoz" International festival in Tashkent. In 2004, the film was presented to the Cannes Film Festival out of the competition. Moreover, his first film made with the 35 mm film stock "Ko'rgilik" (2005) was also presented at "Ijodiy parvoz" festival and "Start" youth festival in Baku, Azerbaijan, eventually.

Starting from 2007, Shahobiddinov's films were presented to many more International screens. O'tov (The Yurt, 2007) was awarded "The best male actor" at Kinoshock festival (Russia), received the Grand Prix at Cinemarina International Festival (Turkey) and Grand Prix at the National Film Festival of Tashkent (Uzbekistan). O'tov later received a special prize from the jury of the Didor International Film Festival in Dushanbe (Tajikistan) and the diploma "For the contribution of Turkic cinematography" at  Golden Minbar International Film Festival.

Parizod (Heaven - my abode, 2012) of Ayub Shahobiddinov was also one of the successful films of his repertoire. "Parizod" awarded "The best director" at New York Eurasian Film Festival (United States), "The best female actor" at "Volokolams frontier" named after S. Bondarchuk (Russia), Grand Prix at Kinoshock (Russia). Parizod was presented in a special screening at the Shanghai International Film Festival.

Colorless dreams (2020) psychological drama was awarded best screenplay at Cinemaking International Film Festival (Bangladesh). It received triple nominations in the national Film Award of Oltin humo: the best director, the best screenplay, the best composer (Uzbekistan).

Shahobiddinov is famous among youth with his commercial films like Sevinch (2004), Telba (Insane, 2008), Belated life (2010), Turist (Tourist, 2013) and sitcom Artist (2016).

Filmography

References 

1977 births
Living people
Uzbekistani film directors
Gerasimov Institute of Cinematography alumni